Danielle Anne Woodward APM OAM (born 20 March 1965 in Melbourne) is an Australian slalom canoeist who competed from the mid-1980s to the early 2000s. Competing in three Summer Olympics, she won a silver medal in the K1 event at the 1992 Summer Olympics in Barcelona.

Woodward was born in Burwood in Melbourne's eastern suburbs and grew up in Newtown in New South Wales.

At the time of the 1992 Summer Olympics she was a Detective with the Australian Federal Police and is currently a Detective Superintendent. In March 2016 Danielle was awarded the Commissioner's Medal for Innovation, recognising her exceptional dedication in combating human trafficking, particularly with the creation and delivery of awareness packages for front line police across Australia.

Woodward was awarded the Medal of the Order of Australia (OAM) on Australia Day 2002 and the Australian Sports Medal on 22 June 2000.

In the 2020 Australia Day Honours List Woodward was awarded the Australian Police Medal (APM).

Woodward was appointed as a director of Australian Canoeing on 29 April 2007. On 15 November 2008, she was elected president of the governing body.

In 2013 Woodward was appointed to the Australian Olympic Committee Executive.

In 2016, she was awarded an AIS Service Award at Australian Institute of Sport Performance Awards.

World Cup individual podiums

References

Sports-reference.com profile
Wallechinsky, David and Jaime Loucky (2008). "Canoeing: Women's Kayak Slalom Singles". In The Complete Book of the Olympics: 2008 Edition. London: Aurum Press Limited. pp. 495–6.

1965 births
Australian female canoeists
Canoeists at the 1992 Summer Olympics
Canoeists at the 1996 Summer Olympics
Canoeists at the 2000 Summer Olympics
Living people
Olympic canoeists of Australia
Olympic silver medalists for Australia
Sportswomen from Victoria (Australia)
Olympic medalists in canoeing
Police officers from Melbourne
Recipients of the Medal of the Order of Australia
Recipients of the Australian Sports Medal
Sportspeople from Melbourne
Medalists at the 1992 Summer Olympics